Khvajeh Shahi (also Romanized as Khvājeh Shāhī; also known as Kwāja Shāh) is a village in Varqeh Rural District, in the Central District of Charuymaq County, East Azerbaijan Province, Iran. At the time of the 2006 census, its population was 593, from 123 families.

References 

Populated places in Charuymaq County